Charles-Édouard Campeau (24 April 1916 – 20 March 1992) was an engineer and a Progressive Conservative party member of the House of Commons of Canada.

He was first elected at the Saint-Jacques riding in the 1958 general election. After serving his only term, the 24th Canadian Parliament, Campeau left federal politics and did not seek further re-election.

References

External links
 

1916 births
1992 deaths
20th-century Canadian engineers
Members of the House of Commons of Canada from Quebec
Progressive Conservative Party of Canada MPs